Soaz or soz (Persian and Urdu: سوز) is an elegiac poem written to commemorate the honor of Husain ibn Ali and his family and Sahabah in the battle of Karbala. In its form the soaz, salam and Marsiya, with a rhyming quatrain and a couplet on a different rhyme. This form found a specially congenial soil in Lucknow (a city in Northern India), chiefly because it was the center of Shia Muslim community, which regarded it an act of piety and religious duty to eulogies and bemoan the person who killed in the battle of Karbala. The form reached its peak in the writing of Mir Babar Ali Anis. A soaz is written to commemorate the honor of Ahl al-Bayt, Imam Hussain and Battle of Karbala. The sub-parts of Marsiya can be called Noha and soz which means the lamentation and burning of (heart) respectively. 

People who recite soaz are known as soazkhawan.

See also
Syed Ali Ausat Zaidi, Prominent Urdu Soazkhawan  
Marsiya
Noha
Rawda Khwani

External links
Soazkhwani by Professor Sibte Jafar Zaidi
Soaz by Sibte Jaffer
Soazkhwani by Syed Ali Ausat Zaidi
Soazkhwani by Azeemul Mohsin
Soazkhuani by Muhammad Ali Naqvi, Hasan Abid Jafri, Abid Hussain Naqvi

Urdu-language poetry
Shia literature
Cultural depictions of Husayn ibn Ali